Žampach viaduct is a railway arch bridge in the territory of Jílové u Prahy in the Czech Republic near the village of Žampach. It is the highest stone bridge in the country. It is 41.73 m high, 109.3 m long, and formed by seven arches, each 12 m wide. It was constructed from 1898 to 1900 mainly by Italian workers.

It is located on track 210 (Vrané nad Vltavou – Čerčany) between the Luka pod Medníkem and Jílové u Prahy stations.

Railway bridges in the Czech Republic
Bridges completed in 1900
Viaducts
Prague-West District